Wet Hot American Summer is a 2001 American teen comedy film directed by David Wain from a screenplay written by Wain and Michael Showalter. The film features an ensemble cast, including Janeane Garofalo, David Hyde Pierce, Molly Shannon, Paul Rudd, Christopher Meloni, Michael Showalter (and various other members of the sketch comedy group The State), Elizabeth Banks, Ken Marino, Michael Ian Black, Bradley Cooper (in his film debut), Amy Poehler, Zak Orth, and A. D. Miles. It takes place during the last full day at a fictional summer camp in 1981, and spoofs the sex comedies aimed at teen audiences of that era.

The film was a critical and commercial failure, but has since developed a cult following, as many of its cast members have gone on to high-profile work. Netflix revived the franchise with the release of an eight-episode prequel series starring most of the film's original cast, on July 31, 2015; and an eight-episode sequel series, set ten years after the original film, on August 4, 2017.

Plot
In 1981, Camp Firewood, a summer camp located near Waterville, Maine, is preparing for its last day of camp. Counselors have one last chance to have a romantic encounter with another person at Camp Firewood. All the while, Ben and Susie, two overzealous drama instructors, attempt to produce and choreograph the greatest talent show Camp Firewood has ever seen. Beth, the camp director, struggles to keep her counselors in order—and her campers alive—while falling in love with Henry, an astrophysics associate professor at Colby College. Henry has to devise a plan to save the camp from a piece of NASA's Skylab, which is falling to Earth.

Shy Coop has a crush on Katie, his fellow counselor, but has to pry her away from her rebellious, obnoxious, and obviously unfaithful boyfriend, Andy. Only Gene, the camp chef, can help Coop win Katie—with some help from a talking can of mixed vegetables. Gary, Gene's unfortunately chosen apprentice, and J.J. attempt to figure out why their friend McKinley has never been with a woman. They are surprised to find that McKinley is in love with Ben, whom he marries in a ceremony at the lake. Victor attempts to lose his virginity with the resident loose-girl Abby, but a series of mishaps get in his way.

Cast

 Janeane Garofalo as Beth
 David Hyde Pierce as Professor Henry Newman
 Molly Shannon as Gail von Kleinenstein
 Paul Rudd as Andy
 Christopher Meloni as Gene
 Michael Showalter as Gerald "Coop" Cooperberg/Alan Shemper
 Marguerite Moreau as Katie Finnerty
 Ken Marino as Victor Pulak
 Michael Ian Black as McKinley
 Zak Orth as J.J.
 A. D. Miles as Gary
 Nina Hellman as Nancy
 Amy Poehler as Susie
 Bradley Cooper as Ben
 Marisa Ryan as Abby Bernstein
 Kevin Sussman as Steve
 Elizabeth Banks as Lindsay
 Joe Lo Truglio as Neil
 Judah Friedlander as Ron von Kleinenstein
 Gideon Jacobs as Aaron
 H. Jon Benjamin as Can of Mixed Vegetables

Production

Background
The film is based on the experiences Wain had while attending Jewish camps, particularly Camp Wise in Claridon Township, Ohio and Camp Modin in Belgrade, Maine. Showalter also drew on his experiences he had at Camp Mohawk in the Berkshires in Cheshire, Massachusetts. During one scene, the counselors take a trip into Waterville, Maine, which is not far from the camp. It is also a parody of, and homage to, other films about summer camp, including Meatballs (1979), Little Darlings (1980), Sleepaway Camp (1983), and Indian Summer (1993). According to Wain, they wanted to make a film structured like the films Nashville, Dazed and Confused and Do the Right Thing—"films that take place in one contained time period that have lots of different characters."

Development
The film's financing took three years to assemble; in a June 2011 interview, Wain revealed the film's budget was $1.8 million; he noted that during the 2001 Sundance Film Festival, the film had been promoted as costing $5 million, in an attempt to attract a better offer from a distributor. Because of the film's relatively small budget, the cast was paid very little; Paul Rudd has stated that he is uncertain that he received any compensation at all for the film.

Filming
Principal photography lasted 28 days in May 2000, and, according to director David Wain, it rained on every day of shooting. Exterior shots were filmed when possible, sometimes under covers or umbrellas, but some scenes were moved indoors instead. In many interior scenes, rain seen outside turns into sun as soon as characters step outside. Due to the cold, the actors' breath can be seen in some outdoor scenes. The film was shot at Camp Towanda in Honesdale, Pennsylvania.

Music
As the film is set in the early 1980s, the film's soundtrack features songs from many popular bands of the era, most notably Jefferson Starship, Rick Springfield, Loverboy, and KISS.

Songs in the film
"Jane" by Jefferson Starship
"Juke Box Hero" by Foreigner 
"Backwards from Three" by Craig Wedren and Theodore Shapiro
"Wet Hot American Summer" by Craig Wedren
"Love Is Alright Tonite" by Rick Springfield
"Danny's Song" by Loggins & Messina
"Turn Me Loose" by Loverboy
"Beth" by Kiss
"Day by Day" from Godspell
"Harden My Heart" by Quarterflash 
"Higher and Higher" by Craig Wedren and Theodore Shapiro
"When It's Over" by Loverboy
"Wet Hot American Dream" by Peter Salett
"Summer in America" by Mr. Blue & Chubb Rock

Release

Theatrical
Wet Hot American Summer premiered at the 2001 Sundance Film Festival, where it was screened four times to sold-out crowds, though it failed to attract a distributor. Months later, USA Films offered the filmmakers $100,000 for the film, with virtually no participation for the filmmakers, an offer the film's investors accepted. It premiered in New York City on July 27, 2001, then received a limited theatrical release in fewer than 30 cities.

Home media
The film was released in both VHS and DVD formats on January 15, 2002 by USA Home Entertainment. In 2011, Wain tried to convince Universal Studios to prepare either a 10th anniversary home video re-release with extra features, or a Blu-ray release, but Universal rejected the ideas. The film was released on Blu-ray on May 12, 2015.

Reception
Wet Hot American Summer received mostly negative reviews from critics. Rotten Tomatoes gives the film a rating of 38%, based on 76 reviews, with an average rating of 4.85/10. The website's critical consensus reads, "Wet Hot American Summers incredibly talented cast is too often outmatched by a deeply silly script that misses its targets at least as often as it skewers them." Metacritic gives the film a score of 42 out of 100, based on 24 critics, indicating "mixed or average reviews".

Roger Ebert rated the film with one star out of four. His review took the form of a tongue-in-cheek parody of Allan Sherman's "Hello Muddah, Hello Fadduh".

In contrast, Entertainment Weekly's Owen Gleiberman awarded the film an "A", and named it as one of the ten best films of the year. Newsweeks David Ansen also lauded it, calling it a "gloriously silly romp" that "made me laugh harder than any other movie this summer. Make that this year." The film has gone on to achieve a cult following.

Actress Kristen Bell stated on NPR on September 2, 2012, that Wet Hot American Summer was her favorite film, having watched it "hundreds of times." NPR host Jesse Thorn said on the April 29, 2014 episode of Bullseye:

Follow-ups

The film is followed by two Netflix series, with one serving as a prequel and one as a sequel. The prequel, First Day of Camp, was released on July 31, 2015, while the sequel, Ten Years Later, was released on August 4, 2017.

Legacy

Anniversary celebrations
Events were held around the country to celebrate the film's 10-year anniversary in 2011 and 2012, including a screening of the film in Boston, an art show in Santa Monica of works inspired by the film, with a reception hosted by Wain, a screening at the Los Angeles Film School with a Q&A with Wain, a 10th anniversary celebration event with the members of Stella in Brooklyn, and a reading of the script at the San Francisco Comedy Festival, with much of the original cast.

Undeveloped TV series
During a 2015 interview with Variety, Wain and Showalter stated that they wrote a pilot for a possible Fox television series based on the film. Wain described the series as a "22-minute Fox sitcom with commercials and nothing Rated R, so it was a little bit odd." The pilot was not picked up for a series.

Documentary
Alongside the prequel series, a making-of documentary, Hurricane of Fun: The Making of Wet Hot, was released on Netflix on July 24, 2015, consisting of behind-the-scenes interviews and footage shot during the filming of the movie.

References

External links

 
 
 
 
 

Wet Hot American Summer (franchise)
2001 films
2001 LGBT-related films
2001 romantic comedy films
American independent films
2001 independent films
American LGBT-related films
American romantic comedy films
American satirical films
American sex comedy films
American teen comedy films
American black comedy films
Films about Jews and Judaism
Films adapted into television shows
Films directed by David Wain
Films set in Maine
Films set in 1981
Films shot in Pennsylvania
Honesdale, Pennsylvania
Films about summer camps
Films set in the 1980s
Films scored by Theodore Shapiro
LGBT-related sex comedy films
2000s teen sex comedy films
2001 directorial debut films
2000s English-language films
2000s American films